Jetair Lufttransport AG was a German airline headquartered in Munich and based at Munich-Riem Airport.

History 

The Company was established as Jetair Luftverwaltung GmbH on 26 February 1982. On 12 December 1983 the company formed a shareholder company with a capital of 30 million Deutsche Mark, of which 2 million came from the employees of the company - the organization of the airline was the same as that of People Express. It subsequently started operations from its base at Munich-Riem Airport in July 1984. The airline however began to run into financial problems in February 1985, and collapsed by the end of that year.

Destinations 
Jetair operated services from its main base in Munich to Athens, Heraklion, Palma de Mallorca, Tel Aviv, Istanbul and London.

Fleet 
The airline's fleet consisted of the following aircraft:

 1 Boeing 727-81

References

External links 

Airlines established in 1982
Defunct airlines of Germany
Airlines disestablished in 1985
1982 establishments in West Germany
German companies established in 1982